Jeremiah George Ware (21 July 1818 – 22 October 1859) was a pastoralist and politician in colonial Victoria, a member of the Victorian Legislative Assembly.

Early life
Ware was born in London, England, son of Jeremiah Ware senior, a grazier.

Colonial Australia
Ware and his family emigrated to Van Diemen's Land, then Ware moved to the Port Phillip District around 1838. Ware represented the Polwarth, Ripon, Hampden, South Grenville in the inaugural Victorian Legislative Assembly from November 1856 to August 1859.

Ware died in Victoria on 22 October 1859, he had married Anne Young McRobie in 1851.

References

 

1818 births
1859 deaths
Members of the Victorian Legislative Assembly
People from London
Australian pastoralists
English emigrants to colonial Australia
19th-century Australian politicians
19th-century Australian businesspeople